Carinachitidae is a family of small shelly fossils identified as cnidarian sclerites based on articulated specimens from the Kuanchuanpu formation.

They grade in morphology to conulariids.

References

Cambrian animals
Cnidarian families
Staurozoa